Catherine Rachel Mott (née Saul, 1836-1880) was a housewife and an inventor. She received one patent in 1878, before her death, for an improved fire escape.

Biography 
Mott was born on November 7, 1836. It is unclear where in New York she was born. She married Francis Roberts Mott who was the son of Valentine Mott a prominent surgeon in New York City. Francis worked as a clerk in the Assay office in New York. They had one daughter, Louisa Mott. Catherine died in 1880 at the age of 44 years. She is buried in Green-Wood Cemetery in Brooklyn, New York.

Patent 

Mott's one patent was for an improved fire escape. She was concerned with the safety of women and children trying to descend a single ladder from a burning building. In this position there was the danger of their clothes, particularly women's skirts getting caught on projecting parts of the building. There was also the added danger of the firemen trying to come up the ladder at the same time. Her proposal was for a cage-ladder to be permanently attached to the wall of the building. Residents of the building were to descend on the inside of the ladder while the fire fighters would ascend the outside of the ladder.

Collections 
 Patent Model-Improvement in Fire-Escapes, April 9, 1878, Patent Number 202,115, Hagley Museum and Library, Wilmington, Delaware

References 

American patent holders
1836 births
1880 deaths